Hyperolius mitchelli (common name: Mitchell's reed frog) is a species of frogs in the family Hyperoliidae. It is found in the area between northeastern Tanzania (including Zanzibar), Malawi, and central Mozambique.

Taxonomy
Hyperolius mitchelli was first described as a subspecies of Hyperolius puncticulatus by  Arthur Loveridge based on specimens collected from near "Fort Johnston, Nyasaland", corresponding to modern Mangochi, Malawi, in 1953. In 1975 it was raised to full species status. Hyperolius rubrovermiculatus from Kenya might be a subspecies of Hyperolius mitchelli.

Etymology
Loveridge did not explain the etymology of the specific name mitchelli he chose for this species. However, the general introduction of the report in which the species was described makes many remarks to Mr. B. L. Mitchell, a naturalist from the Nyasaland Game and Tsetse Department. Mitchell had made significant collections in Nyasaland, the focal area of that report. Loveridge specifically thanks Mr. Mitchell for "furnishing [him] with local information regarding the amphibians". In the same report, Loveridge also named Mitchell's flat lizard (Platysaurus mitchelli) after Mitchell.

Description
The female holotype measures  in snout–vent length and the male paratype . Typically, males measure  and females  in snout–vent length. There are two distinct colour phases, "J" and "F". Juveniles and many mature males have phase J whereas mature females and some mature males have phase F. Phase J has a brownish dorsum with diffuse darker spots. Phase F has a darker dorsum, or lighter brown with diffuse darker spots, and broad, black-edged silverish canthal and dorsolateral lines. Ventrum is yellow to orange for both phases.

Habitat and conservation
Hyperolius mitchelli inhabit dry forest, farm bush, and low-intensity farmland. Breeding takes place in permanent and temporary ponds in rather open forest and farm bush. The clutch size is 50–100 eggs, which are laid on vegetation over water. The species is common and tolerates considerable habitat alteration; it is not considered threatened.

References

mitchelli
Amphibians of Malawi
Amphibians of Mozambique
Amphibians of Tanzania
Amphibians described in 1953
Taxa named by Arthur Loveridge
Taxonomy articles created by Polbot